Sphaerocoma is a monotypic genus of flowering plants belonging to the family Caryophyllaceae. The only species is Sphaerocoma hookeri.

Its native range is Egypt to Northeastern Tropical Africa (Sudan, Eritrea, and Somalia), Sinai Peninsula, Arabian Peninsula, southern Iran, and southwestern Pakistan.

Subspecies
Two subspecies are recognized:
 Sphaerocoma hookeri subsp. aucheri (Boiss.) Kool & Thulin – Arabian Peninsula, southern Iran, and southwestern Pakistan
 Sphaerocoma hookeri subsp. hookeri – Egypt, Eritrea, Sinai, Socotra, Somalia, Sudan, and Yemen

Ecology
In the South Iran Nubo–Sindian desert and semi-desert ecoregion of southern Iran and southwestern Pakistan, Sphaerocoma hookeri subsp. aucheri in association with Euphorbia larica forms one of the ecoregion's typical plant communities.

References

Caryophyllaceae
Monotypic Caryophyllaceae genera
Flora of the Arabian Peninsula
Flora of Northeast Tropical Africa
Flora of Socotra
Flora of Iran
Flora of Pakistan